Efe or EFE may refer to:

People
 Efé people, an ethic group in the Democratic Republic of the Congo
 Efe (zeybek), leaders of Turkish outlaws and soldiers
 Efe (musician), Nigerian musician and media personality

Given name 
Ali Efe Yeğin (born 1993), Turkish professional motorcycle racer
 Efe Abogidi (born 2001), Nigerian basketball player
 Efe Aydan (born 1955), Turkish former professional basketball player
 Efe Cakarel, Turkish entrepreneur
 Efe Ambrose (born 1988), Nigerian footballer
 Efe İnanç (born 1980), Turkish footballer
 Efe Obada (born 1992), Nigerian-American football player
 Efe Özarslan (born 1990), Turkish footballer
 Efe Paul Azino (born 1979), Nigerian writer

Surname 
 Gökçen Efe (1881–1919), Turkish folk hero
 Sam Loco Efe (1945–2011), Nigerian actor and director

Science and engineering 
 2-oxoglutarate dioxygenase (ethylene-forming)
 2-oxoglutarate/L-arginine monooxygenase/decarboxylase (succinate-forming)
 Early fuel evaporator
 Einstein field equations
 Endocardial fibroelastosis, a heart condition in young children
 External field effect in Modified Newtonian dynamics

Other uses 
 EFE, a Spanish news agency
 Efe language
 Empresa de Ferrocarriles Ecuatorianos, the national railway of Ecuador
 Empresa de los Ferrocarriles del Estado, the national railway of Chile
 Exclusive First Editions, a British die-cast bus model manufacturer
 Trofeo EFE, a Spanish football award

Turkish masculine given names